The PDP-7 was a minicomputer produced by Digital Equipment Corporation as part of the PDP series. Introduced in 1964, shipped since 1965, it was the first to use their Flip-Chip technology. The PDP-7 is the third of Digital's 18-bit machines, with essentially the same instruction set architecture as the PDP-4 and the PDP-9.

Hardware
The PDP-7 was the first wire-wrapped PDP computer. Input/output (I/O) included a keyboard, printer, punched tape and dual transport DECtape drives (type 555). The standard core memory capacity was   but expandable up to  

Software
DECsys, the first operating system for DEC's 18-bit computer family (and DEC's first operating system for a computer smaller than its 36-bit timesharing systems), was introduced in 1965. It provided an interactive, single user, program development environment for Fortran and assembly language programs.

In 1969, Ken Thompson wrote the first UNIX system, then named Unics as a pun on Multics despite only using two design elements from Multics, in assembly language on a PDP-7, as the operating system for Space Travel, a game which requires graphics to depict the motion of the planets. A PDP-7 was also the development system used during the development of MUMPS at MGH in Boston a few years earlier.

Sales
The PDP-7  was described as "highly successful." A combined total of 120 of the PDP-7 and PDP-7A were sold. A DEC publication states that the first units shipped to customers in November 1964.

Eleven systems were shipped to the UK.

Restorations
At least four PDP-7s were confirmed to still exist as of 2011 and a fifth was discovered in 2017.

A PDP-7A (serial number 115) was under restoration in Oslo, Norway; a second PDP-7A (serial number 113) previously located at the University of Oregon in its Nuclear Physics laboratory is now at the Living Computer Museum in Seattle, Washington and is completely restored to running condition after being disassembled for transport; Another PDP-7 (serial number 47) is known to be in the collection of Max Burnet near Sydney, Australia, a fourth PDP-7 (serial number 33) is in storage at the Computer History Museum  in Mountain View, California  and a fifth PDP-7 (serial number 129) belonging to Fred Yerian is also located at the Museum, and has been demonstrated running Unix version 0 and compiling a B program.

References

External links
 Information about the PDP-7 and PDP-7/A, including some manuals and a customer list covering 99 of the systems shipped, Digital Equipment Corporation PDP-7.
 

DEC minicomputers
Transistorized computers
18-bit computers
Computer-related introductions in 1965
Products introduced in 1965